Santiago Metropolitan Region is one of Chile's 16 first-order administrative divisions. It is the country's only landlocked administrative region and contains the nation's capital, Santiago. Most commercial and administrative centers are located in the region, including Chile's main international airport, Arturo Merino Benítez International Airport.

History
The region's history of European influence started in 1542, a few days after Santiago was founded. When the Santiago cabildo was built, its function was to supervise the entire territory. Later, with the creation of the cities of La Serena and Concepción and the creation of their respective cabildos, its territorial reach was reduced.

On 30 August 1826, 8 provinces were created, with the Santiago Province being one of them, but it wasn't until 1980 that the Metropolitan Region was created.

Geography
Metropolitana is Chile's only landlocked region and lies in the Intermediate Depression valley between the Chilean Coast Range and the Andes mountains. The Tupungato stratovolcano, measures  on the Argentine border, is one of South America's highest peaks.

The dominant drainage basin feeds into the Maipo River; its main tributaries are the Mapocho, Yeso and Colorado rivers.

Climate and natural features

The climate of the Metropolitan Region is temperate Mediterranean cold, of the kind called continental. Precipitation is concentrated in the winter months, generally as snow over 900 m above sea level and, in colder years, over the city of Santiago. Winter tends to be cold with frequent frosts during which temperature drops below . The summer months are usually dry and hot. The Cordillera de la Costa acts as a climate screen and reduces marine influence, which makes the climate more continental. This situation becomes apparent when comparing precipitation from a coastal location such as Valparaíso (460 mm) with that of Santiago de Chile (360 mm).

The annual median precipitation reaches 367 mm on average. Rural areas tend to be colder, as temperature reaches  in the coldest months (July, August)

Most of the region is made up of an extremely fertile, level prairie that the locals call la Depresión intermedia (Intermediate Depression). The terrain is known for its low elevation in relation to sea level and for being surrounded by hills, as well as emergent so-called island hills, such as Santa Lucía (an ancient extinct volcano), Blanco, and Renca, present today in the city of Santiago.

There is some occurrence of the endangered Chilean Wine Palm, Jubaea chilensis within the Santiago Province; this iconic tree of central Chile had a much larger range prehistorically, before the decimation of much of its habitat by the expanding human population.

Economy and culture
The region's principal industries include manufacturing, services, retail, and financial services. The capital of Santiago serves as the country's administrative, industrial, commercial, financial and cultural center, producing 41.5% of Chile's gross domestic product, according to central bank estimates. The Plaza de Armas, the central square in downtown Santiago, hosts the city's cathedral and city hall. Eight city blocks around the presidential palace, La Moneda, are where most ministries, services and commercial banks can be found. Vitacura and El Golf host most of the city's high-rise buildings and are also home to the Latin American headquarters of several United Nations organizations. Though Santiago's expansion has caused newer vineyards to move to more rural locations, many of the country's oldest wineries, built in the 19th century, have preserved cellars in the valley.

Government and administration
The region is divided into 6 provinces, which are themselves divided into 52 communes. Since 2021 the region is governed by the governor, who is elected by popular vote. The current governor is Claudio Orrego Larraín (Independent).

This table is based on the corresponding Spanish article

References

Gallery

 
Geography of Santiago, Chile
States and territories established in 1980
Regions of Chile